Louis II (Louis Honoré Charles Antoine Grimaldi; 12 July 1870 – 9 May 1949) was Prince of Monaco from 26 June 1922 to 9 May 1949.

Early years
Born in Baden-Baden, (Germany), he was the only child of Albert I, Prince of Monaco (1848–1922), and Lady Mary Victoria Hamilton (1850–1922). His mother was a daughter of William Hamilton, 11th Duke of Hamilton, and his wife, Princess Marie Amelie of Baden.

Within a year of his parents' marriage Louis was born, but his mother, a strong-willed 19-year-old, disliked Monaco and was unhappy with her husband. Shortly thereafter, she left the country permanently, and the princely couple's marriage was annulled in 1880. Louis was raised in Germany by his mother and stepfather, Count (later Prince) Tassilo Festetics von Tolna, along with his eldest half-sister, Maria-Mathilde (later grandmother of Princess Ira von Fürstenberg), and did not see his father until age 11 when he was obliged to return to Monaco to be trained for his future princely duties.

Louis' father, Prince Albert I, was a dominating personality who had made Monaco a center of cultural activity and whose intellectual achievements were recognized around the world. Unhappy to be living with his cold and distant father, Louis went to France as soon as he was old enough to enroll in Saint-Cyr, the French national military college. Four years later, after graduating, he was attached to the French Foreign Legion before serving with a regiment of Chasseurs d'Afrique (African Light Horse) in Algeria.

Before being stationed in Algeria, on a short official visit to Paris, he met Marie Juliette Louvet (1867–1930), a cabaret singer. Juliette was already the mother of two children, Georges and Marguerite, by her former husband, French "girlie" photographer Achille Delmaet. Reportedly, Prince Louis fell deeply in love but, because of her ignominious station in life, his father would not permit the marriage. It has been asserted that Louis ignored his father and married Juliette in 1897: there is, however, no evidence for this allegation. Their out-of-wedlock daughter, Charlotte Louise Juliette, was born on 30 September 1898 in Constantine, Algeria. There is no mention of Marie Juliette Louvet in the authorized biography of her grandson, Prince Rainier III, who is Monegasque by nationality but whose ancestors include people of French, Mexican, Italian, German, Scottish, and English nationality.

Louis served in the French Army for four years from 1895 to 1899, reaching the rank of lieutenant. He was awarded the médaille coloniale (Colonial Medal) and the Cross of the Legion of Honor. At the conclusion of his military service he returned to Monaco, leaving behind his mistress and daughter. At the outbreak of World War I, he re-enlisted in the French Army as a volunteer, serving as a staff officer under General Franchet d’Espèrey. Louis was made a Grand Officer of the Legion of Honor and eventually became a Brigadier General.

Solution to succession aspects in 1911–18
A political crisis loomed for the Prince because without any other heir, the throne of Monaco would pass to his first cousin Wilhelm, the Duke of Urach, a German nobleman who was a son of Prince Albert's aunt, Princess Florestine of Monaco. To ensure this did not happen, in 1911 a law was passed recognizing his out-of-wedlock daughter, Charlotte, as Louis's acknowledged heir, and making her part of the princely family. This law was later held to be invalid under the 1882 statutes. Thus another law was passed in 1918 modifying the statutes to allow the adoption of an heir, with succession rights. Charlotte was formally adopted by Louis in 1919, and became Charlotte Louise Juliette Grimaldi, Princess of Monaco, and Duchess of Valentinois.

Wilhelm, 2nd Duke of Urach, thus placed further back in the line of succession to the throne of Monaco, was chosen as King of Lithuania for a few months in 1918, being known as Mindaugas II. It is thus a moot point whether it would have been possible for him to be the sovereign of two European countries simultaneously, had he in fact succeeded to the throne of Monaco, but he had several sons. In any case he renounced his claim to the principality in 1924, passing it to other French cousins that were also descended from the Grimaldi family, the counts of Chabrillan.

On 17 July 1918, largely because of the von Urach potential claim, France and Monaco signed a brief but far-reaching treaty requiring prior French approval of all future Monégasque princes.  Article 2. specified: "Measures concerning the international relations of the Principality shall always be the subject of prior consultations between the Government of the Principality and the French Government.  The same shall apply to measures concerning directly or indirectly the exercise of a regency or succession to the throne, which shall, whether by marriage or adoption or otherwise, pass only to a person who is of French or Monégasque nationality and is approved by the French Government."  Under article 3 Prince Albert agreed "...for himself and his successors the commitment assumed towards the French Government not to alienate the Principality, in whole or in part, in favour of any Power other than France."

Reign

On 26 June 1922, Prince Albert I died in Paris.  Louis Grimaldi ascended to the throne as Louis II, Prince of Monaco. While his reign never achieved the grandeur of his father, Louis II left an indelible imprint on the tiny principality. In 1924 the Monaco Football Club was formed and in 1929, the first Grand Prix of Monaco automobile race was held, won by Charles Grover (aka "Williams") driving a Bugatti painted in what would become the famous British racing green color.  He collected artefacts belonging to Napoleon I which are now assembled and displayed in the Napoleon Museum attached to the Prince's Palace in Monte Carlo.

Particularly in the earlier years of Prince Louis' reign, he acquired the reputation for administrative probity: he obtained the departure of Camille Blanc who had long managed Monte Carlo Casino, about whom there were increasing questions as to his administration of the Casino's affairs.

In 1931, the prestige of Monaco's cultural life received a boost when René Blum was hired to form the "Ballet de l'Opéra à Monte-Carlo." Just before the outbreak of World War II in 1939, a modern large football stadium had been built where the Universiade were staged at the newly named "Stade Prince Louis II."

While Prince Louis' sympathies were strongly pro-French, he supported the Vichy France government of his old army colleague, Marshal Pétain. Nonetheless, his tiny principality was tormented by domestic conflict partly as a result of Louis' indecisiveness, his questionable financial links with the Nazi regime and also because the majority of the population was of Italian descent and supported the fascist regime of Italy's Benito Mussolini. In 1942, the Italian Army invaded and occupied Monaco. Shortly thereafter, following Mussolini's collapse in Italy, the German army occupied Monaco. On the night of August 27, 1942, Monaco authorities rounded up 90 Jewish residents and handed them over to the Nazis; all but 9 were murdered in the Holocaust. Among them was René Blum, founder of the Opera, who was murdered in Auschwitz, a Nazi concentration camp. 

However, throughout the War, Prince Louis' vacillation caused an enormous rift with his grandson Rainier (the heir-apparent to the throne, after 1944), who strongly supported the Allies against the Nazis. 

For a number of months in 1944, communists participated in the Liberation administration of Monaco.

Following the liberation of Monaco by the Allied forces, the 75-year-old Prince Louis did little for his principality and it began to fall into severe neglect. By 1946, he was spending most of his time in Paris and on 24–27 July of that year, he married in Monaco for the first time. His wife was Ghislaine Dommanget (1900–91), a French film actress and former wife of actor André Brulé. Absent from Monaco during most of the final years of his reign, he and his wife lived at Marchais, the family estate in northern France.

Death and succession, 1949
Prince Louis II died in 1949 in the Prince's Palace and is buried at the Saint Nicholas Cathedral in Monte Carlo, Monaco.  His daughter, Hereditary Princess Charlotte had ceded her succession rights to her son, Rainier, in 1944, at which time he became Hereditary Prince.  Thus when Louis died five years later, he was succeeded by his grandson, Prince Rainier III.

Louis' widow, Ghislaine, Dowager Princess of Monaco, died on 30 April 1991 in Paris, where she was interred in the Passy Cemetery.

Titles and honours

Ancestry

Notes

|-

1870 births
1949 deaths
20th-century Princes of Monaco
People from Baden-Baden
Princes of Monaco
House of Grimaldi
World War II political leaders
Monegasque philatelists
Monegasque princes
Hereditary Princes of Monaco
Officers of the French Foreign Legion
Order of the Francisque recipients
Grand Masters of the Order of Saint-Charles
Marquesses of Baux
Burials at the Cathedral of Our Lady Immaculate
Dukes of Valentinois
Dukes of Estouteville
French military personnel of World War I
Dukes of Mayenne